The 1919–20 Georgia Bulldogs basketball team represents the University of Georgia during the 1919–20 college men's basketball season. The team captain of the 1919–20 season was Kennon Mott.

Schedule

|-

References

Georgia Bulldogs basketball seasons
Georgia
Bulldogs
Bulldogs